KOLARS is a band based in Los Angeles.
Their sound is described as Desert Disco, Space Blues and Glamabilly.

Founded by musicians Rob Kolar and Lauren Brown, both former members of folk group He's My Brother She's My Sister.

In 2017, their self-titled debut album was released to wide critical acclaim; Huffington Post "instantly fell in love with their tantalizing sonics and their energetic apocalyptic marvel", Paste Magazine "KOLARS play their unique blend of 70s glam rock, 90s grunge and twangy country with every inch of their body", Denver Post "KOLARS has a knack for buffing your weathered perspective to a glinting sheen. The world isn't on fire; it's glowing."

KOLARS have played over 400 shows since 2016, including appearances at several music festivals: SXSW, Treefort Festival, Rolling Stone Weekender, London Calling, Gasparilla, Cornbury, Savannah Stopover, Dot to Dot, The Great Escape.

Lauren Brown is a "tap dancing drummer" known for her invention of that specific percussion style.

Rob Kolar currently scores TBS' The Detour and is the grandson of late British actor, Robert Shaw.

References 

Rockabilly music groups
Musical groups from Los Angeles